Innocent Anyanwu  (born 25 September 1982) is a Dutch professional boxer from Amsterdam, Netherlands. He currently holds the Dutch and BeNeLux Super Featherweight titles.

Biography
Innocent Anyanwu was born in Ekwerazu, Imo State, Nigeria. When he was 12 his mother died and Innocent quit school. Shortly thereafter he started to work as a car mechanic in his brother's garage. However, he had a dream to practise sports in Germany, even though he did not know which sport. He left Nigeria when he was 16 and went to Cameroon without a passport because he did not have one. Since Cameroon is a French-speaking country, the language barrier proved a problem. Still, after that, he went to another French-speaking country, Gabon, where a brother of his was living.
Through German tourists, Innocent learned that he needed several visas in order to compete in sports there. Since he did not have a passport, Innocent never went to Europe.

Professional career

Innocent started his boxing career in Amsterdam, Netherlands in 2001. After promising his trainer Martin Jansen total dedication to the sport, an intense training regime started and the cooperation continued until today. After three months Innocent participated in his first boxing match which he won. The victory parade of Innocent continued through the amateur ranks in national and international boxing matches in The Netherlands. Innocent fought against boxers from not only the Netherlands but also from Belgium, Russia and Germany. With only 3 losses (early in his boxing career) in 36 contests, and many wins by (T)KO, Innocent wanted to represent the Netherlands at the Olympics in Athens but was denied because he did not hold Dutch nationality. Innocent then went back to his native country Nigeria where he captured the national amateur title and Champion of Champions trophy at super-featherweight. That enabled Innocent to return to the Netherlands and reunite in 2005 with his longtime boxing trainer Martin Jansen to continue his professional boxing career. 
 
In 2005, Innocent made his pro debut. He fought 20 times up to October 2009 in and outside the Netherlands and never lost a fight. He captured the Dutch national and smaller European (BeNeLux) crown. Innocent's goal is to support his people in Ekwerazu, Nigeria through his boxing career. His results as a sportsman and social human being were awarded by the Dutch Queen with a Dutch passport (with a radio chip and coil), which enables him to participate on short notice in a European championship fight.

Professional boxing record

References

 Innocent Anyanwu: Kippenbakker en profbokser, BN DeStem

External links

 beinnocent.com
 iaminnocent.org

1982 births
Living people
Nigerian male boxers
Sportspeople from Imo State
Boxers from Amsterdam
Dutch male boxers
Super-featherweight boxers